Projapoti Biskut (Bengali: প্রজাপতি বিস্কুট) is a 2017 Bengali film directed by Anindya Chatterjee.

Plot 

Sraboni / Shaon (Ishaa Saha) and Antor Sen (Aditya Sengupta) have been married for 2 years and 5 months; they live in a joint family with Antor's parents, brother, sister-in-law and niece. Unbeknownst to her draconian, Rabindrasangeet-loving, idealist mother-in-law, Shaon has a career writing scripts for Bengali soaps (watching which too are strictly forbidden in the household). In contrast to the fiercely independent Shaon, Antor is usually indecisive and equivocates every time he is asked for his opinion on any matter.

Shaon and Antor are unable to conceive because Shaon suffers from polycystic ovary syndrome - something which causes her a lot of mental anguish. When Shaon's friend, Parijat Mukherjee (Kheya Chattopadhyay), becomes pregnant by her boyfriend, Matthew, and wants to abort the baby, Shaon convinces her to go ahead with the pregnancy and gives her the word that she will adopt the baby and provide it a fine upbringing. Shaon's short-lived dreams of motherhood, however, are soon shattered when Matthew comes back and takes responsibility of the child and Parijat goes back on her word.

The heartbreak, in addition to her frustration with the restrictive household, causes Shaon to leave her in-laws' home and go back to her eccentric father and mother (Aparajita Auddy). However, Antor and Shaon soon run into each other and Shaon expresses her wish to go out for a beer with her estranged husband. Subsequently, the two celebrate their wedding anniversary by checking into a cheap hotel in Diamond Harbour. At the hotel, Shaon confesses that she values her independence of thought, dressing and cultural taste - and was rather restrained in Antor's house. As they are about to reconcile, the couple is arrested by the police on charges of immoral behaviour - something that they manage to escape once Antor's elder brother turns up at the police station with their marriage certificate.
Antor becomes disillusioned with the city and welcomes the transfer to Bhilai. Two days before his journey, he asks Shaon to meet him one last time. As they meet, Shaon tells Antor that she is willing to accompany him to Bhilai. A grateful Antor tells her that he will give her whatever she wants in Bhilai, indicating her freedom in his company as well as motherhood.

Cast  
 Aditya Sengupta as Antor
 Ishaa Saha as Shaon
 Kheya Chattopadhyay as Parijat
 Sonali Gupta as Antor's mother
 Rajat Ganguly as Antor's father
 Aparajita Adhya as Shaon's mother
 Shantilal Mukherjee as Shaon's father
 Rajatava Dutta as Antor's office colleague Niyogi Da
 Priyanka Mondal as Darshana
 Anirban Mullick as Ananjan
 Toshana as Fuchka

Reception 
Sourav Paldhi, in his lukewarm review for Ananda Bazaar Patrika, highlighted Sengupta's acting, but was put .  Sudip Ghosh's review in Ei Samay praised director's attempt at tackling contemporary social issues honestly.

Sound Track

Achievements  

The movie won the WBFJA Award 2018 in the following categories:

 Best Playback Singer (Female)- Chandrani Banerjee for Tomake Bujhina Priyo
 Best Lyrics- Ritam Sen for Tomake Bujhina Priyo

The movie won Filmfare Award 2018 in the following categories:

 Best Actress Critics- Ishaa Saha
 Best Cinematographer- Supriyo Dutta
 Best Production Design- Madhuja Banerjee

References 

Bengali-language Indian films
2010s Bengali-language films
2017 films
Films scored by Prasen
Films scored by Shantanu Moitra
Films scored by Anupam Roy
Films scored by Anindya Chatterjee